Gobiodon citrinus, the poison goby, is a species of goby native to the Indian Ocean from the Red Sea and the coast of Africa to the western Pacific Ocean to Japan, Samoa and the Great Barrier Reef. The mucus produced by this fish is toxic. They grow to a length of  TL. They have varied body colour and could be either dark brown, or pale yellow. They also have blue vertical lines that go around their eyes and gills. This species is also found in the aquarium trade and has been reared in the aquarium.

References

External links 

 Clown Goby, Citrinis
 Gobiodon citrinus
 Gobiodon citrinus from New Caledonia 

citrinus
Fish described in 1838